The 2008 Sandwell Metropolitan Borough Council election took place on 1 May 2008 to elect members of Sandwell Metropolitan Borough Council in the West Midlands, England. One third of the council was up for election and the Labour Party stayed in overall control of the council.

After the election, the composition of the council was:
Labour 49
Conservative 14
Liberal Democrat 5
British National Party 2
Independent 2

Background
Before the election Labour ran the council with 52 of the 72 seats, compared to 11 for the Conservatives, 5 Liberal Democrats, 2 British National Party and 2 independents. This meant the Conservatives could not gain control of the council whatever the results, despite Labour defending 17 of the 24 seats being contested. Other candidates in the election included 12 from the British National Party, 7 from the Green Party and 1 Socialist Labour Party candidate in Oldbury ward.

Election result
The results saw Labour remain in control of the council with 49 seats, but the Conservatives made a net gain of 3 to move to 14 seats. The Conservatives gained 4 of the 17 seats Labour had been defending, in the wards of Bristnall, Cradley Heath and Old Hill, Princes End and Wednesbury South. However Labour did take 1 seat back from the Conservatives in St Pauls ward. Labour put the results down to them keeping council tax levels low and improving services, however the Conservatives said they were moving forward in "a traditional Labour stronghold".

The Liberal Democrats held the 2 seats they had been defending in Great Barr with Yew Tree and Newton wards to stay on 5 seats, while neither the Greens or the British National Party won any seats. The British National Party share of the vote in the 12 seats they contested, dropped to 17% from the 33% they had won in the 2006 election.

Ward results

References

2008 English local elections
2008
2000s in the West Midlands (county)